John H. Thompson was an American politician who served as the fourth Lieutenant Governor of Indiana from 1824 to 1828.

Thompson was born in Kentucky before coming to Indiana. From 1824 to 1828, Thompson served as Lieutenant Governor under William Hendricks and James B. Ray. In 1828, Thompson ran for a seat in the U.S. House of Representatives. His candidacy was supported by Jacksonian Democrats but he lost the election to former Governor Jonathan Jennings. In 1830, Thompson ran as an independent for the same seat, joining a crowded field that also included Jennings, John Carr, William W. Wick, James B. Ray, and Isaac Howk. Thompson lost the race, coming in fifth place. In 1839, Thompson ran as a Democrat against fellow Democrat Johnathan McCarty and Whig James Rariden for the U.S. House seat of Indiana's 5th congressional district. Thompson lost the election to Rariden.

References

Lieutenant Governors of Indiana
Indiana Democratic-Republicans